David P. Smalley (November 29, 1934 – June 1, 2007) was best known as a coach of the United States Naval Academy's men's and women's basketball teams.

He was born in 1934 in Baltimore, Maryland and graduated from the Naval Academy with six letters in basketball and baseball. Smalley captained the baseball team while at the Academy. 

After serving for five years in the United States Marine Corps, Smalley returned to the Naval Academy as an assistant coach of the basketball team. He took over from Ben Carnevale in 1966 and compiled a 94-130 record in his ten seasons as men's coach. 

Smalley then coached the women's team between 1977 and 1989 compiling a record of 179-119. He had winning seasons as coach of the women's team in 10 out of 12 years.

Smalley continued to work in the athletic department of the Naval Academy following the end of his coaching career. In 2006, the Academy named the basketball floor at the Academy after him. He was admitted to the Maryland State Hall of Fame in 2007.

References

External links

1934 births
2007 deaths
American men's basketball coaches
Basketball coaches from Maryland
Basketball players from Baltimore
Burials at the United States Naval Academy Cemetery
Deaths from cancer in Maryland
Navy Midshipmen men's basketball coaches
United States Naval Academy alumni